Zack Silva (born May 9, 1980 in Orcas Island,  Washington) is an American actor known for his role as Alex Thomas on Desire and Watch Over Me. He is a martial arts enthusiast who also enjoys both improv and sketch comedy, as well as writing poetry, drawing and singing. He also enjoys reading comic books.

Filmography
Days of Our Lives (2005) .... Groom
Ray of Sunshine (2006) .... Ethan
Rockin' Romeo & Juliet (2006) .... Capulet Screamer 
Desire (2006) (telenovela) .... Alex Thomas
Watch Over Me (2007) (telenovela) .... Alex Thomas
Dirty Jokes: The Movie (2008)
One Degree (2009) .... Jack Dunn
Herpes Boy (2009) .... Mike
Terriers (2010) .... Gavin
The Assembly Line (2010) .... Ryan
The Other Side (2011) .... Wyatt Moore
Mars, 4 Across. Venus, 7 Down. (2011) .... Good Looking Boy
A Big Love Story (2012) .... Harry
Absolute Madness .... Jack Teller

External links
 
 The Zack Silva Fan club 

Living people
1980 births
American male telenovela actors